Joachim Brennecke (6 December 1919 – 6 September 2011) was a German stage and film actor. During the Second World War he had prominent roles in Nazi propaganda films such as Attack on Baku and 5 June.

Selected filmography
 Zwei Welten (1940)
 Wunschkonzert (1940)
 Above All Else in the World (1941)
 U-Boote westwärts (1941)
 Attack on Baku (1942)
 5 June (1942)
 Der Kahn der fröhlichen Leute (1950)
 The Guilt of Doctor Homma (1951)
 A Heidelberg Romance (1951)
 Shooting Stars (1952)
 The Day Before the Wedding (1952)
 I'm Waiting for You (1952)
 I Can't Marry Them All (1952)
 House of Life (1952)
 Such a Charade (1953)
 Scandal at the Girls' School (1953)
 The Empress of China (1953)
 The Cousin from Nowhere (1953)
 The Crazy Clinic (1954)
 Sun Over the Adriatic (1954)
 The Inn on the Lahn (1955)
 I'll See You at Lake Constance (1956)

References

Bibliography
 Kreimeier, Klaus. The Ufa Story: A History of Germany's Greatest Film Company, 1918-1945.University of California Press, 1999. 
 Taylor, Richard. Film Propaganda: Soviet Russia and Nazi Germany. I.B.Tauris, 1998.

External links

1919 births
2011 deaths
German male film actors
Male actors from Berlin
20th-century German male actors